Walk Softly, Stranger is a 1950 American romantic drama film starring Joseph Cotten and Alida Valli and directed by Robert Stevenson. Also regarded by some as either or both a film noir and crime film, it tells the story of a small-time crook on the run who becomes reformed by the love of a disabled woman. 

This would be the last RKO credit for famed producer Dore Schary, who would leave the studio soon following the film's completion after clashing with RKO's new owner, Howard Hughes.

Filming ended in June 1948, but Hughes shelved the picture indefinitely, pending changes, especially to its ending.  When the pairing of Cotton and Valli earned big headlines for their starring performances in the box office smash Carol Reed film The Third Man in 1949, Hughes resurrected Walk Softly, Stranger and released it in 1950 in an effort to capitalize.

The films's supporting cast features Spring Byington, Paul Stewart, future Tonight Show television talk show host Jack Paar, and John McIntire.

Plot
When a man calling himself Chris Hale arrives at the doorstep of her Ashton, Ohio house, asking to see his childhood home, widow Mrs. Brentman gladly invites him in. The unemployed Chris then accepts Mrs. Brentman's offer of a room and takes a job in the shipping department of the Corelli shoe factory. One night, Chris wanders into the Ashton country club and meets Elaine Corelli, his boss's beautiful but paralyzed daughter. Speaking of the days when he used to deliver newspapers to her door and adored her from afar, Chris amuses and fascinates the once-vibrant Elaine. The next day, Chris is called in to see Elaine's father A. J., who tells him that Elaine was so taken with him that she asked that he be given a better job in sales. Chris declines the offer, but assures Corelli, who is devoted to his daughter, that he will explain his decision to Elaine. As promised, Chris, a confessed gambler and drifter, shows up at the Corelli home to talk with Elaine. Although Chris's explanations are vague, his self-deprecating humor relaxes Elaine, who is finally able to joke about the skiing accident that left her paralyzed.

The next morning, Chris flies to another city for a rendezvous with petty criminal Whitey Lake, who calls him "Steve." Chris and Whitey then rob gambling house owner Bowen of $200,000 in cash, knowing that the crime will never be reported. After splitting the money and advising Whitey to "disappear," Chris returns to Ashton and accepts an invitation for a double date from co-worker Ray Healy. When he then runs into Elaine, however, Chris breaks the date and takes the reluctant heiress to a working class nightclub. Chris's jilted date, Gwen, is also at the club and denounces him in front of Elaine. Although Chris wins a joking bet with Elaine that he can get Gwen to dance with him, Elaine grows despondent watching her would-be rival dance. Sure that Chris will come to resent her paralysis, Elaine leaves suddenly for Florida. When she returns at Christmas, however, Chris resumes his pursuit, and by New Year's Eve, the two are deeply in love. Chris's newfound happiness is short-lived, however, as Whitey shows up, broke and scared. Chris insists that Whitey, who is being chased by Bowen, stay locked up in Mrs. Brentman's house until he can figure out an escape plan. Whitey's nerves are soon frayed, and he begins tearing apart Chris's room in search of Chris's share of Bowen's money.

Then, after he learns that Chris is sending Mrs. Brentman to see her son's grave in Arlington Cemetery, Whitey, who takes afternoon walks in defiance of Chris's orders to stay indoors, becomes convinced that his friend intends to kill him during her absence. Chris finally calms and reassures the now-hysterical Whitey, and sees Mrs. Brentman off at the airport. As he is driving home, he realizes that he is being followed by two men, but manages to reach Elaine's without detection. Chris confesses all to an understanding Elaine, who advises him to return the money. Elaine also reveals that, as she moved to Ashton as a teenager, she knew all along that he was lying about his past. By the time Chris returns to Mrs. Brentman's, Whitey has been killed and the money, reclaimed. The killers then take Chris to see the vengeful Bowen, who, while riding in a car with his prisoner, suggests they both rob Elaine of her fortune. Disgusted, Chris tries to take Bowen's driver by surprise, but is shot by Bowen in the ensuing struggle. The car crashes, and Chris winds up in a police hospital. As the recuperated Chris is about to be transferred to prison, Elaine visits and vows to wait until his release, when he will finally need her the way she has always needed him.

Cast
 Joseph Cotten as Chris Hale
 Alida Valli as Elaine Corelli
 Spring Byington as Mrs. Brentman
 Paul Stewart as Whitey Lake
 Jack Paar as Ray Healy
 John McIntire as Morgan
 Howard Petrie as Bowen
 Jeff Donnell as Gwen

Background
The working title for the film was Weep No More, intended for Cary Grant to star under the direction of Alfred Hitchcock.  The film lost an estimated $775,000, making it one of RKO's biggest flops of the year.

Reception
New York Times film critic Bosley Crowther was tough on the film when it was first released.  He wrote, "The R. K. O. film, Walk Softly, Stranger, which came to the Globe on Saturday and which has Joseph Cotten and Alida Valli, the popular stars of The Third Man, in its top roles, actually was made before the latter picture and apparently withheld from release in the expectation of enhancement of its 'star value' from the Carol Reed film. If such was the case, the people at R. K. O. were well advised, for 'star value' is just about the only thing of any distinction that Walk Softly, Stranger has ... [in short] Walk Softly, Stranger doesn't carry a big stick."

Contemporary film critic Dennis Schwartz was generally disappointed with the film. In 2019 he wrote, "Love saves the day melodrama. The dismal film is worth seeing only for the fine performance of Alida Valli as the rich crippled girl ... [and] the uninteresting clichéd resolution, leaves this film flattening out in its noirish aspects to become an unconvincing soap opera love story."

Shown on the Turner Classic Movies show 'Noir Alley' with Eddie Muller on December 10, 2022. Muller indicated that the original screenplay did not have Cotten's character survive or show the car crash; instead, his last scene being getting into the car with the killers.

References

External links
 
 
 
 
 Walk Softly, Stranger information site and DVD review at DVD Beaver (includes images)
 

1950 films
1950 drama films
American drama films
American black-and-white films
Film noir
Films directed by Robert Stevenson
Films scored by Friedrich Hollaender
RKO Pictures films
1950s English-language films
1950s American films